The 2015 Croatia Open Umag  (also known as the Konzum Croatia Open Umag for sponsorship reasons) was a men's tennis tournament played on outdoor clay courts. It was the 26th edition of the Croatia Open, and part of the ATP World Tour 250 Series of the 2015 ATP World Tour. It took place at the International Tennis Center in Umag, Croatia, from 20 July through 26 July 2015.

Singles main draw entrants

Seeds 

 1 Rankings are as of July 13, 2015

Other entrants 
The following players received wildcards into the singles main draw:
  Toni Androić
  Mate Delić
  Andrey Rublev

The following players received entry from the qualifying draw:
  Laslo Djere
  Thomas Fabbiano
  Matteo Trevisan
  Bastian Trinker

Withdrawals
Before the tournament
  Pablo Andújar →replaced by Damir Džumhur

Retirements
  Andreas Haider-Maurer
  Dušan Lajović

Doubles main draw entrants

Seeds 

 Rankings are as of July 13, 2015

Other entrants 
The following pairs received wildcards into the doubles main draw:
  Paterne Mamata /  Gaël Monfils
  Dino Marcan /  Antonio Šančić

Champions

Singles 

  Dominic Thiem defeated  João Sousa, 6–4, 6–1

Doubles 

  Máximo González /  André Sá defeated  Mariusz Fyrstenberg /  Santiago González, 4–6, 6–3, [10–5]

References

External links 
 

Croatia Open Umag
2015
2015 in Croatian tennis